Hong Kong studies or Hongkongology (Traditional Chinese: 香港學) is a sub-field of East Asian studies involved in social sciences and humanities research on Hong Kong. It incorporates fields such as the study of Hong Kong language, society, culture, creative industries, economy, politics, history and environment.

Academic discipline
In Hong Kong, the School of Modern Languages and Cultures, University of Hong Kong awards undergraduate level Bachelor of Arts honours degree in Hong Kong Studies. There is another university in Hong Kong which has established academy for the studies. The Academy of Hong Kong Studies, Education University of Hong Kong is an academy established in July 2015 to foster Hong Kong Studies within the regional universities. The Department of Social Sciences of the same university awards Bachelor of Social Sciences (Honours) in Global and Hong Kong Studies, and Master of Social Sciences in Global Hong Kong Studies.

Besides, Hong Kong Studies Initiative (HKSI) at the University of British Columbia also contributes in promoting the teaching and research of Hong Kong Studies.

Scholarly journals 
 Hong Kong Studies: a peer-reviewed scholarly journal published by The Chinese University of Hong Kong.

Societies and institutions for Hong Kong studies 
Society for Hong Kong Studies is one of the non-profit academic institute based in Hong Kong, which aims to enhance collaborations among scholars around the world. Another society located in the United Kingdom, the Hong Kong Studies Association aims to provide connections for scholars in European institutions.

See also 
 East Asian studies
 Oriental studies

References